Perry Barr Reservoir is a covered drinking water reservoir, in north Birmingham, England, operated by Severn Trent Water.

The reservoir is supplied by gravity from The Elan Valley, via Frankley Water Treatment Works and the trunk mains system.

The reservoir, completed in 1942, has a concrete dam and holds 84 million litres of water. It supplies areas such as Kingstanding, Perry Barr, Great Barr and Witton.

There are two old, matching signs at the entrance. One reads:

the other:

In August 2013, Severn Trent launched a £2 million project to build a  pipeline linking the reservoir to South Staffordshire Water's Barr Beacon Reservoir, to allow for the exchange of water in emergencies such as severe droughts.

References

Drinking water reservoirs in England
Reservoirs in Birmingham, West Midlands